Henrique Carlos da Mata Galvão (4 February 1895 – 25 June 1970) was a Portuguese military officer, writer and politician. He was initially a supporter but later become one of the strongest opponents of the Portuguese Estado Novo under António de Oliveira Salazar.

Career
On 1 August 1934 he was created a Grand-Officer of the Military Order of Our Lord Jesus Christ.

In the 1940s, while serving as the Angolan Deputy to the Portuguese National Assembly, Henrique Galvão read his "Report on Native Problems in the Portuguese Colonies" at the Assembly. In this report, Galvão condemned the "shameful outrages" he had uncovered under the then "Statute of the Indigenous", notably the forced labour of "women, of children, [and] of decrepit old men." He concluded that, in Angola, "only the dead are really exempt from forced labor". Furthermore, he stated that as many as 30% of all Angolan forced labourers died. Galvão cited the government's policy of replacing deceased native workers, without directly charging the employer, as being instrumental in encouraging the poor care of the workers. Galvão further noted that this practice would often then result in their death, and said that this state policy, which differed from policy in other colonial societies, eliminated the employer's incentive to maintain the welfare of the workers. He therefore accused the Portuguese government, due to its colonial policies, of the elimination of native workers in Angola. The Portuguese government rejected these accusations and ignored Galvão's report. While as a Minister, he was responsible for the launching of the historical documentaries presented for decades until his death by José Hermano Saraiva.

Galvão was arrested in 1952. He was compulsorily retired from his military career, where he was an Army Captain, but was awarded a state pension. In 1959, he escaped from Portugal to Venezuela, where he continued to oppose the Estado Novo at that time.

Shortly before the Portuguese Colonial War, on 22 January 1961, Galvão led the Santa Maria hijacking, also known as Operation Dulcinea. The hijackers seized the ship and took command of the vessel under Galvão's leadership. In this process, they isolated the vessel by cutting off all communication, killing one officer and wounding several others. Galvão used the hijacking to send radio broadcasts from the ship calling attention to his concerns and views on what he characterized as the fascist Portuguese regime. The event received wide international press coverage. It is understood that the hijackers forced the captain of the ship, Mário Simões Maia, along with crew members, to redirect the ship's course. One of the hijackers, Camilo Mortágua, needlessly and with the reproval of Galvão, shot and killed the third mate, João José da Conceição Costa. The liner, rebaptized Santa Liberdade, evaded both the U.S. Navy and British Royal Navy for eleven days before docking safely at Recife, Brazil. On 2 February 1961, the hijackers were met by Brazilian officials off the coast of Recife. After negotiating with Brazilian officials, Galvão released the ship's passengers in exchange for his own political asylum in Brazil. Galvão later said that his original intentions for the operation were to sail the ship to the Portuguese overseas province of Angola, where he had planned to declare the independence of Angola from the Portuguese government, in opposition to António de Oliveira Salazar's regime. Galvão remained exiled in Belo Horizonte, Brazil, where he died in 1970. He was buried in a monumental grave at the Prazeres Cemetery, in Lisbon, in the very same cemetery where the third mate killed during the Santa Maria hijacking also lies in a memorial grave.

On 7 November 1991 he was posthumously awarded with the Grand-Cross of the Order of Liberty.

Writings
Henrique Galvão's writing can be seen in famous published works, including the five-volume 1933 study Da vida e da morte dos bichos: subsídios para o estudo da fauna de Angola e notas de caça (Of Animals Life and Death: Contributions to the Study of the Fauna of Angola and Hunting Notes), co-authored with Teodósio Cabral and Abel Pratas, and Outras Terras, Outras Gentes. Galvão's account of the Santa Maria hijacking was translated into English as Santa Maria: My Crusade for Portugal (New York, 1961).

References

1895 births
1970 deaths
People from Barreiro, Portugal
Portuguese Angola
Portuguese anti-fascists
Portuguese military officers
Portuguese male writers
Hijackers
Legislators in Portugal